Imbs (also known as Imbs Station) is an unincorporated community in Stookey Township, St. Clair County, Illinois, United States.

References

Unincorporated communities in St. Clair County, Illinois
Unincorporated communities in Illinois